Al-Najma Club Stadium is a multi-use stadium in Unaizah, Saudi Arabia. It is currently used mostly for football matches, on club level by Al-Najma. The stadium has a capacity of 3,000

References

goalzz

Football venues in Saudi Arabia
Unaizah